Mecca I'm Coming is a 2019 Indonesian satirical romantic comedy film, written and directed by Jeihan Angga in his feature-length directorial debut. The film stars Rizky Nazar and Michelle Ziudith, as Eddy and Eni, respectively, whose relationship is at risk after Eni is forced to marry Pietoyo (Dwi Sasono), a wicked rich businessman, by her father.

The film had its world premiere at the 2019 Jogja-NETPAC Asian Film Festival. At the 9th Maya Awards, it won five awards for Best Feature Film, Best Directorial Debut Film, Best Actor in a Supporting Role (Rasiti), Best Actress in a Supporting Role (Irawan), and Best Adapted Screenplay, out of twelve nominations. The film marks the final film appearance of Ria Irawan, who died in January 2020.

Premise
A failed mechanic, Eddy, embarks on Hajj pilgrimage to prove himself to his girlfriend, Eni, and her father, before she is forced to marry Pietoyo, a wicked rich businessman.

Cast

Release
Mecca I'm Coming had its world premiere at the 2019 Jogja-NETPAC Asian Film Festival. The film was theatrically released on 5 March 2020. It garnered 82,170 moviegoers during its run and grossed Rp 3.2 billion ($229,704).

Accolades

References

2010s Indonesian-language films
2019 directorial debut films
2019 romantic comedy films
Indonesian romantic comedy films
2010s satirical films
Indonesian satirical films
Films about Islam